Valery Yuryevich Petrakov (born 16 May 1958) is a Russian soccer manager and a former striker. He is the manager of FC Irtysh Omsk.

Playing career
In 1975, at the age of 17, Petrakov began his career with his local team, FC Dynamo Bryansk.  In 1976, he transferred to FC Lokomotiv Moscow where he would play for four seasons.  He played for FC Torpedo Moscow from 1981–1985 and returned to Lokomotiv Moscow for one more season in 1986.

Petrakov spent his final six years abroad with FSV Wacker 90 Nordhausen in Germany and then with IFK Luleå in Sweden before retiring to coaching.  His playing career included two caps and one goal for the Soviet National Team.  He was a member of the 1977 FIFA World Youth Championship champion as well as the 1980 European Youth Championship winner.  In 1986, he played on Lokomotiv's successful Soviet Cup squad.

Coaching career
Immediately after retirement, he was appointed as manager for IFK Luleå, where he finished his playing career. In 1995, he returned to Russia to head another former club, Torpedo Moscow.  While he did not win any championships at Torpedo, his clubs appeared in the UEFA Cup in 1996-1997 and 2000-2001. His club also appeared in the 1997 Intertoto Cup.

In 2001, he moved to Tomsk which played in the Russian First Division at the time. Failing to achieve promotion there, he returned to the Russian Premier League with FC Moscow. He had a brief, unsuccessful stint with FC Rostov in 2005 where he was dismissed after four matches.

He returned to Tomsk for the 2006 season and achieved an 8th place finish. He signs a contract as the new head coach from FC Alania Vladikavkaz on 4 December 2008 .

On 11 November 2019, he joined FC Luch Vladivostok.

Personal life
His son Yuri Petrakov is now a professional footballer.

References

External links
Profile (in Russian)

1958 births
Living people
Sportspeople from Bryansk
Soviet footballers
Soviet expatriate footballers
Russian footballers
Russian expatriate footballers
Expatriate footballers in East Germany
Expatriate footballers in Sweden
Soviet Top League players
FC Dynamo Bryansk players
FC Lokomotiv Moscow players
FC Torpedo Moscow players
Russian football managers
Soviet Union international footballers
FC Tom Tomsk managers
FC Moscow managers
FC Rostov managers
FC Spartak Vladikavkaz managers
Russian Premier League managers
FC Khimki managers
FC Torpedo Moscow managers
IFK Luleå players
Association football forwards
FC Luch Vladivostok managers